Frankie Lou Thorn (born August 27, 1964) is an American actress best known for her role as "The Nun" opposite Harvey Keitel in Abel Ferrara's controversial 1992 film Bad Lieutenant.

Filmography

External links
 

1964 births
Living people
American film actresses
21st-century American women